Bethan Roberts (born 14 May 2003) is a professional footballer who plays as a defender for FA WSL club Reading.

Club career 
Roberts joined Reading's academy at age nine. She made her senior debut for the club on 6 December 2020, coming on in the 80th minute in a FA WSL game against Bristol City.

On 6 July 2021, Roberts signed her first professional contract with Reading, keeping her at the club until the summer of 2023.

International career 
Roberts was called up to the Wales women's national football team for the first time in April 2021.

Career statistics

Club

References

External links 
 Bethan Roberts Reading profile
 Bethan Roberts at Soccerway

2003 births
Living people
Reading F.C. Women players
English women's footballers
Women's association footballers not categorized by position
Welsh women's footballers